Franco Pizzicanella (born 29 May 1996) is an Argentine professional footballer who plays as a goalkeeper.

Career
Pizzicanella's career began with Atlético Tucumán. He was first selected in a senior matchday squad in December 2014, when manager Juan Manuel Azconzábal chose him as a substitute for a Primera B Nacional fixture with Santamarina; though he wasn't used. After fourteen further occasions on the subs bench, Pizzicanella eventually made his professional debut during a 2018 Copa Libertadores group stage fixture with Libertad on 17 May; substituted on following a red card to Alejandro Sánchez.

Career statistics
.

References

External links

1996 births
Living people
Sportspeople from San Miguel de Tucumán
Argentine people of Italian descent
Argentine footballers
Association football goalkeepers
Atlético Tucumán footballers